The 2007 South American Rhythmic Gymnastics Championships were held in San Cristóbal, Venezuela, October 4–7, 2007. The competition was organized by the Venezuelan Gymnastics Federation.

Participating nations

Medalists 

Senior

References 

2007 in gymnastics
Rhythmic Gymnastics,2007
2007 in Venezuelan sport